Patrick William Groves (20 August 1868 – 13 February 1908) was a Scottish footballer who played as a forward for Hibernian, Celtic, West Bromwich Albion, Aston Villa and Scotland. He is known for being the first player to be transferred for more than £100.

Career

Hibernian 
Groves, an inside forward, first broke into the Hibernian squad as a 16-year-old during the 1885–86 season. He featured prominently as Hibs won the Scottish Cup the following year, scoring in the first round, second round replay and semi-final. Vale of Leven, Hibs' opponents in the semi-final, protested that Groves had accepted a payment from Hibs, which would have been illegal as the Scottish game was still amateur at the time. The protest was not heard until after Hibs had defeated Dumbarton in the final. Vale of Leven only presented hearsay as evidence, but it took the casting vote of the committee chairman to exonerate Hibs.

In the following year, Groves made his international debut, in a 1888 British Home Championship match against Wales. Groves scored the fourth goal in a 5–1 win for Scotland at Hibernian Park, Hibs' home ground.

Celtic 

By August 1888, Groves was one of several Hibs players who moved to the newly formed Celtic. He scored ten goals in the club's 1888–89 Scottish Cup campaign. Groves made two further appearances for the Scotland national football team while with Celtic. In one of those appearances he scored a hat-trick against Ireland in the 1889 British Home Championship.

West Bromwich Albion 

Groves moved to the professional English Football League in 1890, signing for West Bromwich Albion. He helped Albion win the 1892 FA Cup Final, playing at half-back as Aston Villa were defeated 3–0.

Aston Villa 

Groves subsequently signed for Villa in 1893, becoming the first player to be transferred for over £100. Villa were forced to pay that fee (around £12,000 in today's values) to West Brom and were fined by the Football Association amidst allegations that Groves and Jack Reynolds had been illegally poached. He helped Villa win the league championship in 1894. During his time in England, Groves played for the Football League against the Scottish League. He left Villa in November 1894 after a dispute over his contract with the club arose.

Return to Scotland 

After Hibs were elected to join the top division of the Scottish Football League in 1895, Groves returned to the club. During this second spell he played in the 1896 Scottish Cup Final, which Hibs lost 3–1 to Edinburgh derby rivals Hearts. This final is perhaps best known for being the only Scottish Cup Final to be played outside Glasgow. He then briefly returned to Celtic, but soon retired, suffering from tuberculosis. He died in Edinburgh in 1908, aged 39.

See also 
List of Scotland national football team hat-tricks
Progression of British football transfer fee record

Notes

References

Sources

External links 
Willie Groves, www.ihibs.co.uk

1868 births
1908 deaths
Aston Villa F.C. players
Celtic F.C. players
Hibernian F.C. players
Association football forwards
People from Leith
Footballers from Edinburgh
Scotland international footballers
Scottish Football League players
Scottish footballers
English Football League players
West Bromwich Albion F.C. players
English Football League representative players
FA Cup Final players
20th-century deaths from tuberculosis
Tuberculosis deaths in Scotland